Breann Moody (born 4 March 1997) is an Australian rules footballer playing for the Carlton Football Club in the AFL Women's competition (AFLW). She was drafted by Carlton with the club's ninth selection and the sixty seventh overall in the 2016 AFL Women's draft. She made her debut in Round 1, 2017, in the club and the league's inaugural match at Ikon Park against . Moody finished 2017 having played in all seven of Carlton's matches that season. At the end of the 2018 season, she was the joint winner of the club best and fairest alongside Katie Loynes.

She received an All-Australian blazer for the first time in 2021 after being named as the ruck in the 2021 AFL Women's All-Australian team.

Personal life
Moody is the daughter of race horse trainer Peter Moody, known for training Black Caviar. She has a twin sister, Celine Moody, who plays in the AFLW for Western Bulldogs.

Moody is currently studying a Bachelor of Exercise and Sport Science/Bachelor of Business (Sport Management) at Deakin University.

Statistics
Statistics are correct to the end of the 2021 season.

|- style="background:#EAEAEA"
| scope="row" text-align:center | 2017
| 
| 16 || 7 || 1 || 0 || 24 || 10 || 34 || 1 || 6 || 83 || 0.1 || 0.0 || 3.4 || 1.4 || 4.9 || 0.1 || 0.9 || 11.9 || 0
|- 
| scope="row" text-align:center | 2018
| 
| 16 || 7 || 0 || 0 || 33 || 20 || 53 || 7 || 11 || 147 || 0.0 || 0.0 || 4.7 || 2.9 || 7.6 || 1.0 || 1.6 || 21.0 || 1
|- style="background:#EAEAEA"
| scope="row" text-align:center | 2019
| 
| 16 || 8 || 2 || 3 || 22 || 13 || 35 || 10 || 8 || 69 || 0.3 || 0.4 || 2.8 || 1.6 || 4.4 || 1.3 || 1.0 || 8.6 || 0
|- 
| scope="row" text-align:center | 2020
| 
| 16 || 7 || 0 || 1 || 31 || 20 || 51 || 1 || 101 || 117 || 0.0 || 0.1 || 4.4 || 2.9 || 7.3 || 1.4 || 1.6 || 16.7 || 0
|- style="background:#EAEAEA"
| scope="row" text-align:center | 2021
| 
| 16 || 9 || 1 || 1 || 66 || 40 || 106 || 28 || 14 || 170 || 0.1 || 0.1 || 7.3 || 4.4 || 11.8 || 3.1 || 1.6 || 18.9 || 3
|- class="sortbottom"
! colspan=3 | Career
! 38
! 4
! 5
! 176
! 103
! 279
! 56
! 50
! 586
! 0.1
! 0.1
! 4.6
! 2.7
! 7.3
! 1.5
! 1.3
! 15.4
! 5
|}

References

External links

Living people
1997 births
Carlton Football Club (AFLW) players
Australian rules footballers from Victoria (Australia)
Sportswomen from Victoria (Australia)